James Henry O'Brien (July 15, 1860 – September 2, 1924 in Brooklyn) was an American politician from New York.  A Democrat, he served terms in the New York State Senate from 1911 to 1912, and United States House of Representatives for one term from 1913 to 1915.

Early life and education 
O'Brien was born in Jamaica, Queens County, New York on July 15, 1860.  He attended the public schools in Queens, and graduated from Browne's Business College in Brooklyn.

Business career 
He became a resident of the town of East New York, which was later incorporated into the city of Brooklyn.  O'Brien worked as a machinist and mechanical engineer, and later owned and operated the J. H. O'Brien Scale & Supply Company, a business that manufactured commercial scales and equipment used in constructing overhead tramways.

Political career

State Senate 
O'Brien became active in politics as a Democrat.  He was a member of the New York State Senate (10th D.) in 1911 and 1912.  While in the Senate, he served as chairman of the Agriculture Committee, and was chairman of the state's Food Investigating Commission.

Congress 
O'Brien was elected as a Democrat to the 63rd United States Congress, and served from March 4, 1913, to March 3, 1915.  He was an unsuccessful candidate for reelection in 1914.

Later career and death 
After leaving Congress, O'Brien resumed management of his business interests.  He served as a delegate to the Democratic National Convention in 1916.  He died in Brooklyn on September 2, 1924, and was buried at Holy Cross Cemetery.

Family
O'Brien was married to Catherine "Kate" Lyons.  They were the parents of four sons and three daughters; William, James, Thomas, Edward, Geraldine, Anna, and Estelle.

References

Sources

Newspapers

External sources

People from East New York, Brooklyn
1860 births
1924 deaths
Democratic Party New York (state) state senators
Democratic Party members of the United States House of Representatives from New York (state)